This list of museums in Ontario, Canada contains museums which are defined for this context as institutions (including nonprofit organizations, government entities, and private businesses) that collect and care for objects of cultural, artistic, scientific, or historical interest and make their collections or related exhibits available for public viewing. Also included are non-profit art galleries and university art galleries.  Museums that exist only in cyberspace (i.e., virtual museums) are not included.

See also List of museums in Ottawa for museums in the city of Ottawa.
See also List of museums in Toronto for museums in the city of Toronto.

Current museums

Defunct museums
 Canadian Ski Museum, moved from Ottawa to Mont-Tremblant, Quebec in 2013
 Chesley Heritage & Woodworking Museum, Chesley, closed in 2013
 Clark House Museum, Powassan, closed 2012
 Criminals Hall of Fame, Niagara Falls, closed 2014
 Dairy Museum, Aylmer
 Edison Museum, Vienna, closed 2016
 Elliott Avedon Museum and Archive of Games, closed in 2009, collections now at the Canadian Museum of Civilization
 First Hussars Museum, London
 Guy Lombardo Museum, London, closed in 2007
 Innisville Museum, Innisville, closed 2007
 Jolley's Riding Toy Museum, Meaford, closed 2016
 Kingston Archaeological Centre, Kingston
 Mahoney Dolls House Gallery, Fort Erie, closed 2010
 Memory Junction Railway Museum, Brighton, closed 2018
 MS Norgoma, Sault Ste. Marie, closed 2019
 The Niagara Falls Museum, Niagara Falls
 Personal Computer Museum, Brantford, closed 2018
 Revolution Frères Museum, Moosonee
 Riverview Miniature Village, Peterborough, closed 2014
 Scugog Shores Heritage Centre and Archives, Port Perry, closed 2019
 Seagram Museum, Waterloo
 Shania Twain Centre, Timmins, closed in 2013
 Timmins Underground Gold Mine Tour, Timmins, closed in 2013
 Woodstock Peace Lighthouse, Woodstock, closed circa 2016

See also

 Nature centres in Ontario

References

External links

Ontario Museum Association

 
Ontario
Museums